Gabe Louis Levin (גייב לוין; born August 2, 1994) is an American-Israeli professional basketball player who last played for the South Bay Lakers in the NBA G League.  He played college basketball for the Loyola Marymount Lions and the Long Beach State Beach.

Early and personal life
Levin was born in Chicago, Illinois, grew up in Oak Park, Illinois, and is Jewish. His parents are Mary Jo and Hillel Levin, and he has two brothers and two sisters. His brother Aaron played basketball at Grinnell College, and is now an assistant coach for the school's basketball team.  He is 6' 8" (202 cm) tall, and weighs 230 pounds (104 kg).

College career
Levin attended Oak Park and River Forest High School, and averaged almost 20 points and 10 rebounds per game as a senior. He was a fourth-team All-State selection of the Illinois Basketball Coaches Association, and was named to the ESPN Chicago All-Area Team.

Levin then attended St. Thomas More School in Oakdale, Connecticut, for a year of post-graduate studies.  He was a First-Team All-New England Preparatory School Athletic Council selection. 

He attended Loyola Marymount University (Psychology) in 2013-14. Levin played for the Loyola Marymount Lions, averaged 11.1 points and 7.2 rebounds per game, and was fifth in the conference with 1.2 blocks per game. In 2014 he was West Coast Conference All-Freshman Team. He redshirted during the 2014-15 season, attending Marquette University. 

Levin then transferred to California State University, Long Beach in 2015, where he played basketball for the Long Beach State Beach from 2015 to 2018. In 2015-16 he averaged 9.5 points and 5.9 rebounds per game, averaged 2.2 offensive rebounds a game (second in the league), shot 50.2% from the field (sixth-best in the Big West Conference), and was seventh with 0.8 blocks per game. In 2016 he was All-Big West Honorable Mention.  In 2016-17 he averaged 12.2 points and 6.2 rebounds per game, until a fractured knee injury ended his season, which was followed by successful knee surgery. In 2017-18 he averaged 18.5 points (third in the Big West) and 7.3 rebounds per game, and was third in the Big West in field goal percentage (.455), fourth in rebounds per game (7.2), and sixth in free throw percentage (.815). On February 3, 2018, Levin scored 45 points to match a 47-year-old Long Beach State men’s basketball record. On January 15, 2018, he was named Big West Player of the Week, and in 2018 he was Big West First Team.

Professional career

Bnei Herzliya (2018–2021)
He has played for Bnei Herzliya Basket in the Israeli Basketball Premier League in 2018-19 and 2020-2021.

South Bay Lakers (2022)
On November 3, 2022, Levin was named to the opening night roster for the South Bay Lakers. On December 21, 2022, Levin was waived.

References

1994 births
Living people
American men's basketball players
Basketball players from Chicago
Israeli men's basketball players
Jewish American sportspeople
Jewish men's basketball players
Long Beach State Beach men's basketball players
Loyola Marymount Lions men's basketball players
Marquette University alumni
People from Oak Park, Illinois
South Bay Lakers players